The Scottish Highland Football League (SHFL, commonly known as the Highland League) is a senior football league based in the north of Scotland. The league sits at level 5 on the Scottish football league system, acting as a feeder to the Scottish Professional Football League.

Founded in 1893, it is currently composed of 18 member clubs in a single division. Geographically, the league covers the Scottish Highlands as well as Moray, Aberdeenshire, the cities of Aberdeen and Dundee, Angus and parts of northern Perthshire.

Since 2014–15, it has featured in the senior pyramid system. The winners take part in an end of season promotion play-off with the Lowland Football League champions, with the winners then competing against the bottom club in Scottish League Two for a place in the SPFL. Promotion and relegation also exists between the three Highlands-based regional leagues at level 6 (Midlands League, North Caledonian League, and North Superleague).

The league's current sponsorship deal is with the Breedon Group.

Format

Each team in the league plays each other twice during a season – once at home, once away, for a total of 34 matches. The standard league scoring system of 3 points for a win and 1 for a draw is applied, with ties in the league table broken by goal difference. The champions are presented with the League trophy and a flag, either immediately after the match which secures the victory, or at the next match at which it is practical to do so.

With the introduction of the new pyramid structure in Scottish football, a new schedule was introduced in the 2014-15 season, in order to ensure that all matches affecting the title are completed in time for the promotion playoffs beginning in April. As the region is prone to severe weather in winter, postponements have sometimes caused the conclusion of the season to be delayed (e.g. in 2013, a prolonged spell of bad weather meant the final matches were not played until 25 May). Various proposals which would have reduced the number of matches a team would play (either by instituting a two-phase season like that used in the Scottish Premiership, or by dividing the League into two smaller divisions), were considered but did not find favour with League members. Instead, clubs now play both a Saturday and a Wednesday fixture most weeks from August through October, taking advantage of milder weather at the start of the season. The new schedule builds in a four-week buffer near the end of the season during which no matches are initially scheduled, allowing any backlog of postponed matches to be cleared before the final fixtures.

Scottish Cup 
All clubs are full members of the Scottish Football Association, so qualify automatically for the following season's first round of the Scottish Cup. The league champions and the runner-up team receive a bye into the cup's second round. Since 2014 the champions have taken part in the Scottish Challenge Cup; this was extended to the top four clubs from 2016. In 2016 the champions also gained a place in the Scottish League Cup.

History

Formation
The Highland Football League was formed on 4 August 1893, at the Inverness Workman's Club by employees of the Highland Railway Company who had their Company Headquarters, Locomotive and Carriage & Wagon Workshops (Loch Gorm Works), based in the Highland capital. The original league consisted of seven teams: Inverness Thistle, Caledonian, Clachnacuddin, Forres Mechanics, Inverness Union, Inverness Citadel and Cameron Highlanders. Dingwall Victoria United (later renamed Ross County) were an eighth original member, but resigned membership in November 1893. The inaugural champions were Inverness Thistle. Of the original teams, two are still playing in the league today (Clachnacuddin and Forres Mechanics) while Caledonian and Thistle merged to become current Scottish League club Inverness Caledonian Thistle.

Departures and expansions

The league has been somewhat weakened by the departure of many former members who have subsequently joined the SFL. This happened in 1994 when Caledonian, Inverness Thistle and Ross County left. Until then the HFL had operated with 18 clubs; this was reduced by the departure of the three mentioned clubs, but Wick Academy from the North Caledonian Football League were elected, to create a league of 16 clubs. This was the state of affairs till 2000 when Elgin City and Peterhead were elected into the SFL. In 2002 Inverurie Loco Works were elected into the HFL to give it a membership of 15 clubs. Inverurie Locos are another Highland League football club with its origins in the Scottish railways, having been formed by employees of the Great North of Scotland Railway who had their Locomotive and Carriage and Wagon Workshops in Inverurie, hence the football club's name.

In 2008, North Region Junior League sides Formartine United and Turriff United both submitted bids to join the Highland League, following in the footsteps of past Junior League side Inverurie Locos. Banks O' Dee and Strathspey Thistle also applied. On 25 February 2009, Formartine United, Strathspey Thistle and Turriff United were accepted into the league for the following season, with Banks O' Dee being the unsuccessful club.

Pyramid
Until the reorganisation of Scottish football during the 2012–13 season, the league was historically one of the senior leagues in Scottish football, along with the Scottish Premier League and Scottish Football League, as well as the East of Scotland and South of Scotland Leagues.

Since the 2014–15 season, the league champions have had the chance to qualify for promotion to the Scottish League Two via a play-off with the winners of the Lowland Football League, the winners then playing off against the bottom team in League Two. Although the introduction of a route into the Scottish Professional Football League was broadly welcomed, it also provoked some concern about the potential financial burden on smaller clubs who may need to significantly upgrade their grounds to meet the required standards. The logistics of travel to away games in a league dominated by central belt teams is also a concern, particularly for geographically remote clubs such as Wick Academy and Brora Rangers.

At the end of the 2018–19 season, Cove Rangers became the first Highland League club to gain promotion to the SPFL via the pyramid play-off, after beating Berwick Rangers 7–0 on aggregate in the League Two play-off final. Two years later, Brechin City became the first SPFL club to be relegated into the Highland League after losing 3–1 on aggregate to Kelty Hearts in the League Two play-off final.

At the end of the 2020–21 season the threat of relegation was introduced to the league, as the North Caledonian League, a newly formed Midland League, and North Superleague were all brought into the pyramid as a feeder league. At the end of the following season, Fort William became the first victim of the drop as they failed to play their games against North Superleague side Banks O' Dee in the playoff final, giving the Aberdeen side a bye into the Highland League as Fort William fell into the North Caledonian League.

Member clubs

Former members
Elected to the Scottish Football League
Elgin City, 2000;
Caledonian*, 1994;
Inverness Thistle*, 1994;
Peterhead, 2000;
Ross County, 1994;

*Caledonian and Inverness Thistle combined to form Inverness Caledonian Thistle upon joining the Scottish Football League in 1994.

Promoted to the Scottish Professional Football League
Cove Rangers, 2019;
Relegated to the North Caledonian League/Midlands League/North Region League

 Fort William, 2022; (North Caledonian League)

Other competitions
The main competitions are:
Scottish Highland League Cup
SHFL U17 League

The North of Scotland FA Clubs compete in the:
North of Scotland Cup
North of Scotland FA U20 League

The Aberdeenshire FA clubs compete in the:
Aberdeenshire Cup
Aberdeenshire Shield
Aberdeenshire & District League

List of HFL championship winners

* Team promoted to Scottish League Two
Source:  Scottish Football Historical Archive – Highland League Final Tables

Performance by club
 
Clubs currently playing in the league are shown in bold. Clubs no longer active are shown in italics.

Notes

References

External links
 
 Former official website
 Final Tables 1893–present (pdf file)

 
5
Football in Aberdeenshire
Football in Aberdeen
Football in Highland (council area)
Football in Moray
1893 establishments in Scotland
Sco
Professional sports leagues in the United Kingdom